is a Japanese voice actress born in Kobe, Hyōgo, Japan, employed by the talent management firm Aoni Production. She is also a singer under the name AiM and a songwriter under the name ai. She is best known in the English-speaking world for her work as both a voice actress and a singer in the original Japanese version of the Digimon anime series.

Discography

Singles

Best Album

Filmography

Anime

Film

OVA
 Spectral Force 2 ~Eien naru Kiseki~ Range (2001)
 Halo Legends (Odd One Out) Cortana (2010)

Video Games
 Dark Escape 3D, Female Protagonist
 Kemono Friends, Tamama (Girl Type)
 Real Sound: Kaze no Regret, Girls (1997)
Xenosaga Episode I, Shion Uzuki (2002)
Zatch Bell video games, Megumi Oumi (2003)
Xenosaga Episode II, Shion Uzuki (2004)
Samurai Warriors series, Oichi and Samurai Woman (2004-current)
Namco × Capcom, Shion Uzuki (2005)
Azumi2 Death Or Love (2005)Xenosaga Episode III, Shion Uzuki (2006)
 Tokimeki Memorial Girl's Side 2nd Kiss, Haruhi Nishimoto (2006)Warriors Orochi series, Oichi (2007-19)Yggdra Union: We'll Never Fight Alone (PSP version), Nietzsche and Eudy (2008)Rune Factory 2, Yue/Aria (2008)
 Persona 4, Chihiro Fushimi (2008)Digimon Adventure PSP, Mimi Tachikawa (2013)
 Deception IV: Another Princess, Valgyrie (2014)
 Digimon Story: Cyber Sleuth, Sayo (2015)
Counter:Side, Serina (2021)

References

Nakagami, Yoshikatsu et al. "Voice Actress Spotlight". (June 2007) Newtype USA''. pp. 112–113.

External links
 
 Ai Maeda at Aoni Production.

Living people
Japanese women pop singers
Japanese video game actresses
Japanese voice actresses
Voice actresses from Kobe
Anime musicians
Musicians from Kobe
1975 births
20th-century Japanese actresses
21st-century Japanese women singers
21st-century Japanese singers
21st-century Japanese actresses
Aoni Production voice actors